The Beaver Lake point is a projectile point of the Paleoindian period. Archaeologists have related this point to the Dalton tradition and to the Simpson point. Beaver Lake points are lanceolate (leave-shaped), narrow, and side-notched. They are 4.1 to 5.1 cm long, 1.7 to 2.1 cm wide, and 0.4 to 0.5 cm thick. Beaver Lake points are found in the Ohio and Tennessee river valleys and to a lesser extend in adjacent areas and much of the Southeastern United States.

References

External links

Projectile points